Parthiva Sureshwaren (born 21 February 1980) is an Indian race car driver born in Chennai.

Career

A1 Grand Prix
Sureshwaren drove in the 2006-07 A1 Grand Prix season for A1 Team India at the Australian round, replacing Narain Karthikeyan. He did so again for the 2007–08 season, replacing the injured Karthikeyan at Durban. He competed in Formula V6 Asia for the remainder of 2007 and got 2 podium finishes at the Sepang International circuit. He then hoped to move to the IndyCar Series in 2009.

Formula Two
In 2010, Sureshwaren began competing in the FIA Formula Two Championship, taking part in the first six rounds and scoring points in Monza, Italy. In 2011 he elected to continue in the series. In 2012 Parthiva Sureshwaren started his 3rd season in the FIA Formula two championship and took part in 4 rounds at Silverstone, Algarve, Nurburgring and Spa Francorchamps.

Racing record

Complete motorsports results

American Open-Wheel racing results
(key) (Races in bold indicate pole position, races in italics indicate fastest race lap)

Barber Dodge Pro Series

Complete A1 Grand Prix results
(key) (Races in bold indicate pole position) (Races in italics indicate fastest lap)

Complete FIA Formula Two Championship results
(key) (Races in bold indicate pole position) (Races in italics indicate fastest lap)

References

External links
 Career statistics from Driver Database
 

1980 births
Living people
Motorsport people from Chennai
Indian racing drivers
British Formula Three Championship drivers
Formula V6 Asia drivers
A1 Team India drivers
FIA Formula Two Championship drivers
Barber Pro Series drivers
MRF Challenge Formula 2000 Championship drivers
A1 Grand Prix drivers
Eurasia Motorsport drivers
Arena Motorsport drivers